Robert C. Pringle, originally named Chequamegon, was a wooden-hulled American tugboat that sank without loss of life on Lake Michigan, near Sheboygan, Wisconsin, on June 19, 1922, after striking an obstruction (possibly floating driftwood).

Chequamegon was built in 1903 in Manitowoc, Wisconsin, by the Manitowoc Shipbuilding & Dry Dock Company. She was built for the newly formed Chequamegon Bay Transportation Company of Ashland, Wisconsin, under whom she hauled freight between Ashland, Bayfield, Washburn and Madeline Island. Between 1904 and 1918, she was sold multiple times, and was renamed Pere Marquette 7 in 1911. In 1918, Pere Marquette 7 was sold to the Pringle Barge Line of Cleveland, Ohio. She was converted to a tug and was renamed Robert C. Pringle.

On June 18, 1922, Robert C. Pringle began towing the wooden bulk freighter Venezuela from Milwaukee to Sandusky, Ohio, where the Venezuela was scheduled to receive extensive repairs. At about 2:00 a.m. on the following day, as the vessels were passing Sheboygan, Robert C. Pringle struck an obstruction (some contemporary reports state a piece of driftwood) and began taking on water fast. Despite her pumps being in operation, the water eventually extinguished her boilers, forcing her crew to abandon her and row to Venezuela. All of the crewmen were delivered safely to Manitowoc.

Robert C. Pringles wreck was discovered in 2008 by Steve Radovan. In the summer of 2019 it was subjected to a thorough archaeological survey by the Wisconsin Historical Society, who described the wreck as "remarkably intact". The wreck of Robert C. Pringle was listed on the National Register of Historic Places on December 14, 2020.

History

Design and construction
Robert C. Pringle (Official number 127764) was built as Chequamegon in 1903, by the Manitowoc Shipbuilding & Dry Dock Company on the banks of the Manitowoc River in Manitowoc, Wisconsin. The first vessel built by the newly established shipyard, she was launched at 3:06 p.m. on May 9, 1903, as hull number #1. She had a gross register tonnage of 141 tons, and a net register tonnage of 112 tons.

A single   Scotch marine boiler supplied the engine with steam. The engine was manufactured in Montague, Michigan, by the Montague Iron Works, while her boiler was manufactured in Ferrysburg, Michigan, by the Johnson Brothers Company.

Chequamegon had two decks, no mast, and a round stern. At great expense, her cabins were fitted out with oak woodwork and upholstered furniture.

Service history
Chequamegon was built for the Chequamegon Bay Transportation Company of Ashland, Wisconsin, who intended to use her as an excursion vessel between Ashland, Wisconsin, Bayfield, Wisconsin, Washburn, Wisconsin and Madeline Island. She was issued a temporary enrollment on June 13, 1903, in Milwaukee, Wisconsin, and on June 23, she was issued a permanent enrollment at Marquette, Michigan. In the middle of September, her trips to Madeline Island were discontinued, and she was moved to Duluth, Minnesota, where she was fitted with a new propeller in order to improve her speed. She made excursions around the Apostle Islands on September 26 and 27, and October 10 and 11. Scheduled to be moved to Milwaukee in 1904, she made her final trip on May 21, 1904, between Ashland and Washburn, arriving in Milwaukee the day after her final trip. In June of that same year, Chequamegon began transporting passengers from Milwaukee to Pabst's Whitefish Bay Resort. She was chartered by the Benton Transit Company of Benton Harbor, Michigan, in August 1904, and had bulwarks fitted to her lower deck. During this time, she ran between Benton Harbor and Milwaukee. Chequamegons propeller was damaged on September 12, 1904, while she was inbound for Milwaukee. When Louis A. Cartier, president of the Chequamegon Bay Transportation Company moved to Ludington, Michigan, she briefly hauled fruit towards the end of the shipping season, from Benton Harbor and St. Joseph, Michigan, to Milwaukee. Chequamegon resumed her trips for Pabst's Whitefish Bay Resort, briefly engaging in the fruit trade in September 1906. On April 22, 1907, Chequamegon was sold to R. Floyd Clinch of Chicago, Illinois; her home port was changed to Chicago. Chequamegon was transferred to Clinch's Traverse Bay Transportation Company in 1908. In that same year, she was taken to Sturgeon Bay, Wisconsin, where she received a new  propeller, built by H.G. Trout & Company of Buffalo, New York. After receiving some additional repairs, she returned to her Charlevoix, Michigan – Traverse City, Michigan route. On August 18, 1909, Chequamegons cook, Sanford M. Silver drowned after falling overboard.

In 1911, Chequamegon was sold to the Pere Marquette Line of Steamers. Her name was changed to Pere Marquette 7 on January 30. She ran between Chicago, Waukegan, Illinois, Milwaukee, Kenosha, Wisconsin and Port Washington, Wisconsin, carrying freight. In April 1914, Pere Marquette 7 was overhauled and repainted in Sturgeon Bay. In 1918, Pere Marquette 7 was sold to the Pringle Barge Line Company of Mentor, Ohio, and was renamed Robert C. Pringle. She was converted to a tugboat in Sandusky, Ohio, and had her home port changed to Fairport, Ohio. She towed barges in the Lake Erie coal trade. Briefly during her career, she was renamed Henry R. Heath.

Final voyage
The Pringle Barge Line Company acquired the wooden bulk freighter Venezuela in 1922. As Venezuela required significant repairs, Robert C. Pringle was dispatched to Milwaukee, Wisconsin, in order to tow Venezuela to Sandusky, Ohio, where the repairs were scheduled to be made. The vessels departed Milwaukee at around midnight on June 18, with Robert C. Pringle under the command of Captain Martin Oglesbee. At around 2:00 a.m. on the following day, as Robert C. Pringle and Venezuela were passing Sheboygan, Wisconsin, Robert C. Pringle struck an obstruction (possibly floating driftwood), and began taking on water fast. She sank in ten minutes, with all her crew being rescued by Venezuela, who dropped her crew off in Milwaukee. Venezuela proceeded to sail to Sandusky under her own steam. After she sank, there was speculation that Robert C. Pringle sank because of a weakness in her hull due to her age.

Robert C. Pringle wreck
Radovan had been searching for her since the 1970s, locating the wrecks of the schooners Floretta and Home in the process. Her wreck is upright and was described by the Wisconsin Historical Society as "remarkably intact on a sand and silt covered lake bottom, with little damage or deterioration". Her pilothouse, along with the glass in four of its windows, remains in place. The captain's cabin, located behind the pilothouse is also intact. Robert C. Pringles triple expansion engine still has gold lettering on it. In 2019, maritime archaeologists from the Wisconsin Historical Society partnered with Tom Crossmon's Crossmon Consulting LLC to conduct a thorough archaeological survey of the wreck.

References

Sources

External links

1903 ships
Maritime incidents in 1922
Tugboats on the Great Lakes
National Register of Historic Places in Sheboygan County, Wisconsin
Shipwrecks of Lake Michigan
Great Lakes ships
Merchant ships of the United States
2008 archaeological discoveries
Shipwrecks of the Wisconsin coast
Ships built in Manitowoc, Wisconsin
Wreck diving sites in the United States